The Lovetones are an Australian psychedelic rock band. Their current lineup includes: 
Matthew J. Tow - vocals/guitars
Matthew Sigley - bass/keyboards/vocals
Liam Judson - guitars
Robert de Freitas Young - guitars
Chris Cobb - drums/percussion

History

The Lovetones released their debut album, Be What You Want, in 2002 through Bomp! Records subsidiary The Committee To Keep Music Evil.  The album was reviewed in Creem and Rolling Stone magazines. The latter hailed Matthew J. Tow's songwriting as being worthy of comparisons to Ray Davies, Bowie, Lennon and McCartney.

After enjoying the critical success of Be What You Want, touring Australia extensively, and even supporting Morrissey during his first-ever solo Australian tour, Tow joined The Brian Jonestown Massacre in 2003. He contributed two tracks to their album, ...And This Is Our Music.  Tow's opening track "Starcleaner" later also appeared on the BJM retrospective Tepid Peppermint Wonderland. In the same year, UK-based Fire Records invited The Lovetones to contribute to the James Joyce Chamber Music project alongside Mercury Rev, Sonic Youth, and REM's Peter Buck. In 2004, The Lovetones released the Stars EP, which coincided with their support of The Brian Jonestown Massacre on their tour of Australia.

The second album, Meditations, was released through New York's Tee Pee Records in late 2005. After returning from shows in the US in late 2005 and a 2006 appearance at SXSW, The Lovetones toured to support Meditations''' Australian release in May 2006. In June 2006, The Lovetones completed a European tour across 12 countries with The Brian Jonestown Massacre in support of Meditations, which was released in Europe through Tee Pee/Cargo Records and garnered an album review in the respected UK magazine Uncut.

The Lovetones recorded their third album, Axiom, during 2006, with sessions split between Figment Studios in Hollywood and the Sydney Opera House Recording Studio. It was released in June 2007 through Tee Pee Records.

Their fourth album, Dimensions, was released 4 November 2008 in Australia through Undercover Records and 6 April 2009 in North America through Planting Seeds Records.

The Lovetones performed a reunion show in Sydney on 31 July 2015. They released their latest single "Way The Light Dances" on December 24, 2022.

Discography

 Albums 
 Be What You Want (2003), Yep! Records / The Committee To Keep Music Evil
 Meditations (2005), Yep! Records / Tee Pee Records
 Axiom (2007), Yep! Records / Tee Pee Records
 Dimensions (2008), Yep! Records / Planting Seeds Records
 Lost (2010), Yep! Records / Planting Seeds Records
 Myriad'' (2020), Cleopatra

Singles 
 "Be What You Want EP" (2002), Yep! Records
 "Give It All I Can EP" (2002), Yep! Records
 "Stars/It's Not Over Yet" (2003), Numero Group
 "Stars EP" (2003), Chatterbox Records
 "Wintertime In Hollywood" (Split with Belles Will Ring) (2007), Various Artists Presents
 "Way The Light Dances" (2022), United Records NYC

Compilation 
 "Provenance - Collected Works" (2012), Yep! Records/Undercover Music

External links
https://thelovetones.bandcamp.com/ - The Lovetones on Bandcamp
https://open.spotify.com/artist/2HWopRhahfEImyLGkdgFuo?si=zgKgsUiFRPyi6scWGbiOgA" - The Lovetones on Spotify
https://web.archive.org/web/20060409173338/http://www.myspace.com/thelovetones  – The Lovetones on Myspace 
https://web.archive.org/web/20060629073709/http://www.rhino.com/RZine/rhinocasts/podcastkeeper.lasso?shownum=13  – The Lovetones interview/live performance at rhino.com (Nov 2005)
http://www.adasam.plus.com/rayman/idx1.htm – Colorsound (Matthew J Tow solo project)

Australian indie rock groups
Australian psychedelic rock music groups